"Just Because" is a song written by Joe Shelton, Sydney Robin and Bob Shelton and originally recorded by Nelstone's Hawaiians (Hubert Nelson and James D. Touchstone) in 1929 and later recorded by The Shelton Brothers in 1933.  Some sources say that Sydney Robin wrote the song alone and the Sheltons added their name when they recorded it.

Covers
The song has been covered many times, especially since the Shelton Brothers recording. In 1933, RCA Victor released a version of the song done by the Lonestar Cowboys. Nelstone's Hawaiians Victor V40273 (1929)

The song was also recorded by Frankie Yankovic. Columbia agreed to release Yankovic's version of "Just Because" in 1948. This recording was inducted into the Grammy Hall of Fame in 1999.

Elvis Presley recorded the song on September 10, 1954 at the Sun Studios; while it was never released on Sun, it was included on Elvis's first album, Elvis Presley after he signed to RCA. Paul McCartney later recorded the song in a style that was similar to that of Presley's version on his CHOBA B CCCP album.

Al Hirt released a version on his 1964 album, Beauty and the Beard.

One database devoted to rockabilly music lists 17 issues of "Just Because" in the 1950s and 1960s.

"Just Because" is the theme song of the Peninsula Banjo Band of San Jose, California. They have opened with the song at every performance since roughly 1966.

Jorma Kaukonen included a version on his 2002 album release Blue Country Heart.

The song is also included on Brian Setzer's 2005-release Rockabilly Riot Vol. 1: A Tribute to Sun Records.

References 

1933 songs
1935 songs
Eddy Howard songs
United States National Recording Registry recordings